Double Run is an unincorporated community in Wilcox County, in the U.S. state of Georgia.

History
A variant name was "Doublerun". A post office called Doublerun was established in 1902, and remained in operation until 1919. The community was so named on account of a railroad junction near the original town site.

References

Unincorporated communities in Wilcox County, Georgia